Maurice R. Chevillard was a pioneering French aviator who set a record on 6 November 1913 when he looped a biplane five times in succession at Juvisy. He was in a Henri Farman biplane powered by an 80 horsepower Gnome et Rhône radial engine.

References

Year of birth missing
Year of death missing
French aviation record holders
Aerobatic record holders